Thai Thangai Paasam is a Tamil-language, released in 1995, written, directed and produced by T. Rajendar. Rajender himself appeared in the lead role,. The film released on 14 April 1995.

Cast

 T. Rajendar
 Sithara
 S. S. Chandran
 Jaishankar
 Kavitha
 Subhashri
 Oru Viral Krishna Rao
 Srividya
 Silambarasan
Keerthana
Kuralarasan
Rajeev
Idichapuli Selvaraj
S. S. Chandran
Vennira Aadai Moorthy
Raghava Lawrence in a special appearance
Kanal Kannan  in a special appearance

Soundtrack
Soundtrack was composed by T. Rajender who also wrote lyrics.
"Andha Mama" - SPB
"Roop Tera" - T. Rajendar, Sndhu
"Naan Petra" - Sindhu
"Ilamayile" - Suresh Peters, Noyal
"Hey Muniyamma" - Mano, Swarnalatha

References

External links
 

1995 films
1990s Tamil-language films
Films directed by T. Rajendar
Films scored by T. Rajendar
Films with screenplays by T. Rajendar